Allostock is a village and civil parish in the unitary authority of Cheshire West and Chester and the ceremonial county of Cheshire, England, about five miles south of Knutsford and 20 miles south of Manchester. Allostock was formerly in the borough of Vale Royal until it was abolished on 1 April 2009 to form Cheshire West and Chester. Allostock is located on an affluent of the river Weaver. It had a population of 816  according to the 2011 census data as well as 325 households.

John Bartholemew wrote this in 1887 about Allostock:

"Allostock, township, Great Budworth par., mid. Cheshire, 5 miles S. of Knutsford, 3017 ac., pop. 501."

Origin 
Allostock's name was developed from the Old English word 'Lostock', which means a place of piggeries. The first part of the name, added to distinguish it from Lostock Gralam, may be from 'Hall', or from 'Auld' or 'Old Lostock' which eventually led to the name Allostock. Despite it being overlooked in the Doomsday Book, the origin of the name implies that the piggery was a growing concern before the Norman invasion and possibly even the Romans. The earliest recorded reference of 'Alostocke' was in the 13th century in the Leycester of Tabley papers. During the Saxon settlement in the 7th-century part of today's Allostock was named 'Bradshaw' ("the broad wood"). The name still exists in Brook, with Bradshaw Brook Farm, Bradshaw Brook Methodist church and Bradshaw House.

Places of interest
Shakerley Mere is a former sand quarry that was filled with water when production was stopped in the 1960s. It is home to much wildlife, and fishing and dog walking are popular activities around the area. There are two churches in Allostock, one is part of the ecclesiastical parish of St Oswald's, Lower Peover. There is also Bradshaw Brooks Methodist church on Middlewich road. Allostock has no school and younger children usually attend Byley School – some going to Lower Peover C.E. Primary School. Older children can go to Holmes Chapel Comprehensive and Knutsford and Middlewich also have comprehensive schools. There are three pubs/restaurants in Allostock, The Drovers Arms, The Three Greyhounds on the junction between Middlewich road and Holmes Chapel road, and The Cottage located on the A50.

Hulme Hall 

Hulme Hall with its moat and medieval bridge is Allostock's oldest and most archaeologically significant monument. The site is an English Heritage Scheduled Ancient Monument and the Hall and bridge are Grade II* listed structures. Danes settled at Hulme Hall in the 10th and 11th century and there are records than an Anglo-Norse squire (Hame) who lived here, perished in the Battle of Namptwiche in the Northern Rebellion of 1069. "Houlme" was an early version of the Norse word meaning "land above the water" or "island". The other entrance is reputed to be the site of the old drawbridge. Recent renovations have found evidence of medieval and earlier occupation, a record of which is with the Chester Records Office.

History 
Allostock has links dating back to the 7th century. With known records of Allostock dating to the 13th century. Allostock is known with strong connections to two old families, the Grosvenors and the Shakerleys.

Grosvenors 

The manor of Allostock was conveyed to the Grosvenors in the reign of Edward I by John de Lostock. The Grosvenors had their chief seat at Hulme in this township, till the death of Robert Grosvenor Esq., in whom the male line of the elder line became extinct in 1465, when his estates were divided between his daughters.  A part of the manor was inherited by Sir John Leicester, who married one of the heiresses of the Grosvenors.  Mr Shakerley inherited a fifth from his ancestor who married the heiress of John Legh, of Booths. In 1234 Richard Grosvenor of Hulme (ancestor of the Duke of Westminster) took over Hulme Hall from another Norman family. This Richard Grosvenor was related to Hugh Lupus, the first Norman Earl of Chester. In 1269 Richard built a Chapel of Ease at Lower Peover to save the long journey to Great Budworth. In 1464 Robert Grosvenor had a Chantry Chapel built at Lower Peover which was pulled down in 1547 under Henry VIII. The Grosvenors also established Hulme Mill (opposite Mill Gate Farm) and Bradshaw Brook was diverted about ¾ of a mile to obtain a better head of water.

Shakerleys 

In 1453 the Shakerleys inherited Hulme Hall and about 1000 acres of Allostock's 3000 acres, through the female line. Several of the Shakerleys are buried in the Shakerley Chapel in the south aisle of Lower Peover Church where memorials may be seen including one to Sir Geoffrey Shakerley who fought for the King in the Civil War. At the Battle of Rowton Moor near Chester, Sir Geoffrey rowed across the Dee in an old tub with his horse swimming beside him. Roundheads were blocking the roads and he needed to warn the King. The King hesitated with his orders. Sir Geoffrey rowed back but arrived too late and the battle was lost. In Lower Peover Church the Shakerley crest (a hare and a wheat sheaf) can still be seen on several of the box pew ends. The pews were reserved for the Shakerley tenants. In 1720 the Shakerleys built Somerford Hall (now demolished) as their main residence and Hulme Hall became a farm house.

See also

Listed buildings in Allostock

References

External links

Villages in Cheshire
Civil parishes in Cheshire